Marshevet Hooker (born September 25, 1984) is a professional sprinter, competing internationally for the United States and sponsored by adidas. Hooker participated in the 2008 Summer Olympics at Beijing, China, finishing 5th in the 200 metres.
In the 100 meters, Hooker became the fifth-fastest woman up to that point (under any conditions) when she ran a wind-aided 10.76 (+3.4) to win the first heat of the 100m quarterfinals at the 2008 Olympic Trials.

In June 2006, Hooker elected to forgo her final season of collegiate eligibility to pursue a professional track and field career. Hooker, an eight-time All-American, left the University of Texas as one of the most decorated student-athletes in the program's history.

Hooker, a corporate communications major, made her mark as one of the top athletes in collegiate track and field during the 2005 outdoor season, when she helped Texas to its fourth NCAA outdoor title. Hooker became UT's third NCAA 100-meter champion and its first since 1991, when she claimed the event in 11.14 seconds. She also anchored the 4x100-meter relay team to victory in 42.87, the third-fastest time in school history. Hooker took second in the long jump, finishing only behind eventual World champion and Olympic gold medalist Tianna Madison.

Hooker is coached by Olympic gold medalist Jon Drummond.

Career highlights
5th at 2008 Beijing Olympics in 200m
3rd at 2008 Olympic Trials in 200m
4th at 2008 Olympic Trials in 100m
2006 NCAA Indoor 60m and LJ champion
Two-time Big 12 Women's Indoor Track Athlete of the Year (2005 and 2006)
2005 NCAA 100m and 4 × 100 m champion

Personal bests
 100 meters – 10.86 2011(10.76w)
 200 meters – 22.34 2008(22.20w)

Personal life
Her sister, Destinee Hooker, is an indoor volleyball player who competed in the 2012 Summer Olympics.

References

External links
 
 
 
 
 

1984 births
Living people
American female sprinters
Athletes (track and field) at the 2008 Summer Olympics
Olympic track and field athletes of the United States
Texas Longhorns women's track and field athletes
World Athletics Championships medalists
World Athletics Championships winners
Olympic female sprinters